Idan Cohen (born January 6, 1996) is an Israeli association footballer.

Early life
Cohen was born in United States to an Israeli Jewish family, and he immigrated with them back to Israel when he was two years old. After 6 years, they had returned to the U.S., and when he was eleven years old they family finally settled in Ramat Gan, Israel.

Professional career
Cohen had played with Israeli club Hapoel Tel Aviv U19 team before making his debut with the senior team in 2015. He made 75 appearances with the team between 2015 and the end of the 2019-2020 Israeli Premier League season. He signed with American second division team Hartford Athletic on September 4, 2020. In June 2021, Cohen signed with Israeli second division club Hapoel Ramat Gan Givatayim F.C.

International career
Cohen played for the Israeli U19, U18, U17 and U16 teams, making 41 total appearances with the various youth national teams.

References

External links
 

1996 births
Israeli Jews
Living people
Israeli footballers
Footballers from Ramat Gan
Hapoel Tel Aviv F.C. players
Hapoel Rishon LeZion F.C. players
Beitar Tel Aviv Bat Yam F.C. players
Hartford Athletic players
Hapoel Ramat Gan F.C. players
Maccabi Petah Tikva F.C. players
Liga Leumit players
Israeli Premier League players
USL Championship players
Israeli expatriate footballers
Expatriate soccer players in the United States
Israeli expatriate sportspeople in the United States
Association football defenders
Israel under-21 international footballers
American people of Israeli descent